The graceful pitta (Erythropitta venusta), sometimes alternatively known as the black-crowned pitta (although this term is more regularly applied to E. ussheri), is a species of bird in the family Pittidae. It occurs in Sumatra and Indonesia, where its natural habitat is subtropical or tropical moist montane forests. It is threatened by habitat loss.

Gallery

References

External links
BirdLife Species Factsheet.
Image at ADW 

graceful pitta
Birds of Sumatra
graceful pitta
Taxonomy articles created by Polbot